Alain-Pierre Baclet (born 26 May 1986) is a French footballer who plays as a striker for Italian Eccellenza amateurs Promosport.

Career
Baclet played on Lille OSC's youth teams from 2001 to 2004, then moved to Italy to begin his professional career.

In July 2009, he was signed by U.S. Lecce in co-ownership deal. He had an impressive start, scoring four goals in a Coppa Italia match against Vico Equense and some decisive last-minute goals in the league, but spent most of the season on the bench. On 21 August 2009, the opening match of Serie B, he scored twice in his Serie B debut. He only started 12 league matches in 30 league appearances. In June 2010, Lecce bought him outright.

In July 2010, he was sent to Serie B side Vicenza in a co-ownership deal, for €400,000, as part of Davide Brivio's deal. In June 2012 Vicenza acquired Baclet outright for free.

On 30 August 2012, Baclet was swapped for Alex Pinardi of Novara. Both players were tagged for €1 million as well as signing a three-year contract, thus made both clubs had a paper profit of €733,334 and €812,076 respectively.

On 3 August 2013, he was signed by Casertana, as well as on 1 September 2014 left for Pro Patria.

In the 2015–16 season he played for Martina Franca.

In June 2016 he signed for Cosenza, becoming a crucial player in the 2017–18 season with five goals in the play-off rounds, which saw Cosenza reach promotion to Serie B for the first time in 15 years.

In January 2019 he moved to Reggina. On 5 August 2019, he was loaned to Virtus Francavilla.

After having played two seasons at the Serie C level with Potenza, on 19 October 2022 Baclet moved down to amateur football by joining Lamezia Terme-based Eccellenza club Promosport.

Honour
Coppa Italia top scorer: 2009–10

References

External links
 
 

1986 births
Footballers from Lille
Living people
French footballers
U.S. Russi players
S.S.D. Città di Gela players
S.S. Arezzo players
S.S. Juve Stabia players
U.S. Lecce players
L.R. Vicenza players
Frosinone Calcio players
Novara F.C. players
Casertana F.C. players
Aurora Pro Patria 1919 players
A.S. Martina Franca 1947 players
Cosenza Calcio players
Reggina 1914 players
Virtus Francavilla Calcio players
Association football forwards
Serie B players
Serie C players
French expatriate footballers
Expatriate footballers in Italy
French expatriate sportspeople in Italy